Gare de Mézidon is a railway station serving the town Mézidon-Canon, Calvados department, Normandy, northwestern France. 

It is situated on the Mantes-la-Jolie–Cherbourg railway.

Services

The station is served by regional trains to Argentan, Caen, Lisieux and Rouen.

References

External links
 

Railway stations in Calvados
Railway stations in France opened in 1855